JHF may refer to:
 Jordan Handball Federation
 Jewish Healthcare Foundation
 John Hancock Financial
 Jason Horne-Francis